Luis Santaliz Capestany (October 26, 1914 – November 17, 1989) was one of the members of the Constitutional Convention of Puerto Rico which met from 1951 to 1952 and drafted what is now known as the Constitution of Puerto Rico.  Previously, he served as Mayor of the town of Las Marías, Puerto Rico from 1945 to 1948.

He is honored by his native town with one of its main public elementary schools, named after him.

References 

Popular Democratic Party (Puerto Rico) politicians
Mayors of places in Puerto Rico
Members of the Senate of Puerto Rico
1914 births
1989 deaths
People from Las Marías, Puerto Rico